Oenothera tetragona, the glaucous evening primrose, is a species of flowering plant in the family Onagraceae, native to eastern North America, and introduced to Germany, the Czech Republic, and Myanmar. The Royal Horticultural Society considers it a good plant to attract pollinators. There is a cultivar, 'Glaber', also known as 'Clarence Elliott'.

References

tetragona
Flora of Ontario
Flora of Quebec
Flora of Nova Scotia
Flora of Missouri
Flora of Illinois
Flora of the Northeastern United States
Flora of the Southeastern United States
Plants described in 1800